Halshany (Olshan) is a village and former town in the Grodno Region of Belarus. It is known as the former seat of the Olshanski princely family and the location of the ruined Halshany Castle.

History
According to a legend the town was founded by the founder of the Alšėniškiai family of Lithuanian nobility. It was the place of birth of the Lithuanian princess  and later the Grand Duchess of Lithuania and queen of Poland Sophia of Halshany, extending Lithuanian Jagellon dynasty over two states.

During the times of the Polish–Lithuanian Commonwealth the town was in the hands of the Sapieha family, which constructed a castle there in early 17th century. The town grew smaller with the devastations of the mid-17th century wars wrought in the Commonwealth. The town became part of the Russian Empire with the partitions of Polish–Lithuanian Commonwealth in the 18th century.

After the First World War the town became a part of the Second Polish Republic; it was taken by the Soviet Union after the Soviet invasion of Poland and became part of the Belorussian SSR. After the dissolution of the Soviet Union it became part of modern Belarus.

Notable residents 

 Ben Zion Goldberg (1895-1972), Yiddish journalist
 Jazep Hermanovich (1890 - 1978), Belarusian Eastern Catholic priest, writer, poet and Gulag survivor
 Janka Viarsocki (in Belarusian Янка Вярсоцкі)(1888-1937), Belarusian religious and political activist of the early 20th century, victim of the Soviet repressions

See also 
 Halshany Castle

References 

Populated places in Grodno Region
Villages in Belarus
Oshmyansky Uyezd]
Wilno Voivodeship (1926–1939)